Jayanthi Kumaresh is an Indian Veena musician. Jayanthi comes from a lineage of musicians who have been practising Carnatic music for six generations and started playing the Saraswati Veena at the age of 3. Her mother, Lalgudi Rajalakshmi, was her first teacher and she later underwent intense training from her maternal aunt, Padmavathy Ananthagopalan. She was also taught by S. Balachander and went on to perform with him as well. She is married to Kumaresh Rajagopalan (b 1967), the younger of the violinist duo Ganesh–Kumaresh. She is the niece of violinist Lalgudi Jayaraman.

A researcher, Jayanthi holds a doctorate for her work on "styles and playing techniques of the Saraswati veena" and conducts workshops and lecture demonstrations around the world. She founded the Indian National Orchestra, where a group of artists from Carnatic and Hindustani genres representing the rich musical and cultural heritage of India come together under one banner to showcase Indian classical music.

Jayanthi composed and released the album "Mysterious Duality," which is a multi-dimensional reflection of the simple yet complex self – through a single instrument, the Saraswathi Veena. The artist has played 7 different Veena tracks and this album is one of its kind.

Awards
Jayanthi has been awarded with the following:

 1990, 1992, 2000, 2002, 2012, 2015, 2016, 2017, 2018, 2019 : "Award for Veena" - The Music Academy, Chennai - Madras Music Academy
 2003: A-TOP grading, from the All India Radio
 2004: Maharajapuram Santhanam Memorial Award
 2006: State award of Kalaimamani from Tamil Nadu Government
 2010: Veena Nada Mani - Kanchi Kamakoti Peetham
 2013: Sangeetha Choodamani - Sri Krishna Gana Sabha, Chennai
 2014: Asthana Vidwan at Sringeri Sharadha Peetham

References

Living people
Indian women musicians
Tamil musicians
Saraswati veena players
Year of birth missing (living people)